Muldestausee-Schmerzbach was a Verwaltungsgemeinschaft ("collective municipality") in the district of Anhalt-Bitterfeld, in Saxony-Anhalt, Germany. It was situated on the right bank of the Mulde, east of Bitterfeld. It was named after the reservoir in the river Mulde in its territory. The seat of the Verwaltungsgemeinschaft was in Schlaitz. It was disbanded on 1 January 2010.

The Verwaltungsgemeinschaft Muldestausee-Schmerzbach consisted of the following municipalities:

 Burgkemnitz 
 Gossa 
 Gröbern 
 Krina 
 Muldenstein
 Plodda
 Pouch 
 Rösa 
 Schlaitz
 Schwemsal

References

Former Verwaltungsgemeinschaften in Saxony-Anhalt